Katie Forward (born September 11, 1994) is a Canadian curler from Fredericton, New Brunswick. She currently is the lead on Team Andrea Kelly. She has won three New Brunswick Scotties Tournament of Hearts and two New Brunswick junior titles.

Career

Juniors
Forward's first national level event was at the 2013 Canadian Junior Curling Championships as lead for Jessica Daigle. There, her team went 4–6 threw the round robin and championship pool, missing the playoffs. She returned the following year with the same team as in 2013 and they once again went 4–6.

Women's
Out of juniors, Forward joined the Melissa Adams rink. She was the teams alternate before moving up to lead following Lister's departure. They competed at the 2017 New Brunswick Scotties Tournament of Hearts which was Forward's second, having been the teams alternate the previous year. After going 4–2 in the round robin, the team won the tiebreaker and the semifinal to advance to the final. There, they scored four points in the sixth end en route to a 9–6 win. At the Hearts, the team would have to win the pre-qualifying event to qualify for the main draw. After going 3–0 in the round robin portion, they came up short in the final against Northwest Territories Kerry Galusha.

Adams left the team after the season to join the Robichaud rink and Jillian Babin joined the team at second. At provincials, the team lost in the semifinal to Sarah Mallais.

After Ward moved to skip her own team in Newfoundland and Labrador, the team brought on veteran Andrea Crawford to skip the team. At the 2019 New Brunswick Scotties Tournament of Hearts, Team Crawford posted a perfect 5–0 record en route to capturing the title. At the Hearts, the team went 3–4, missing the playoffs.

To start the 2019–20 curling season, Team Crawford won their first two events, the Steele Cup Cash and the Atlantic Superstore Monctonian Challenge. They played in a Grand Slam event, the 2019 Tour Challenge Tier 2. After a 2–2 round robin record, they lost the tiebreaker to Jestyn Murphy. The team defended their provincial title by winning the 2020 New Brunswick Scotties Tournament of Hearts in late January 2020. At the Hearts, the Crawford rink started with three losses before rallying off four wins in a row including scoring a seven ender against top-seeded Manitoba's Kerri Einarson rink to win 13–7 and defeating Team Canada (skipped by Chelsea Carey) 7–5. Their 4–3 round robin record qualified them for the tiebreaker against Saskatchewan's Robyn Silvernagle rink. Saskatchewan took two in the extra end for a 9–7 victory, eliminating New Brunswick from contention. The team announced on June 18, 2020 that they would be adding Sylvie Quillian to the team at third.

Due to the COVID-19 pandemic in New Brunswick, the 2021 provincial championship was cancelled. As the reigning provincial champions, Team Crawford was given the invitation to represent New Brunswick at the 2021 Scotties Tournament of Hearts, but they declined due to work and family commitments. Team Melissa Adams was then invited in their place, which they accepted.

Team Crawford played in five tour events during the 2021–22 season, performing well in all of them. In their first event, The Curling Store Cashspiel, the team reached the final where they lost to Nova Scotia's Christina Black upon giving up a stolen victory. They then lost in the final of the Steele Cup Cash two weeks later to the Melodie Forsythe rink. They would then secure two victories in their next two events, going undefeated to claim the titles of the Dave Jones Stanhope Simpson Insurance Mayflower Cashspiel and the Atlantic Superstore Monctonian Challenge. The team then had a semifinal finish at the Stu Sells 1824 Halifax Classic, dropping the semifinal game to Switzerland's Corrie Hürlimann.

The 2022 New Brunswick Scotties Tournament of Hearts was cancelled due to the pandemic and Team Crawford were selected to represent their province at the 2022 Scotties Tournament of Hearts in Thunder Bay, Ontario. At the Hearts, the team began the event with five straight wins, the most consecutive wins to start a Tournament of Hearts of any New Brunswick team. Team Crawford finished the round robin with a 6–2 record, qualifying for the playoff round over higher seeded teams such as Wild Card #2 (Chelsea Carey), Wild Card #3 (Emma Miskew) and Saskatchewan's Penny Barker. They then defeated the Northwest Territories' Kerry Galusha in the knockout round and upset Team Canada's Kerri Einarson to reach the 1 vs. 2 page playoff game, becoming the first New Brunswick team to reach the playoffs since Heidi Hanlon in 1991. They then lost to Northern Ontario's Krista McCarville in the 1 vs. 2 game and Canada's Einarson rink in the semifinal, earning the bronze medal from the event. After the event, the team announced they would be parting ways with second Jillian Babin due to her relocation to Ontario. They then announced on March 4, 2022 that Jill Brothers would be joining them as their new second.

Mixed
Forward represented New Brunswick at one Canadian Mixed Curling Championship in 2018 with Chris Jeffrey, Jillian Babin and Brian King. The team finished 2–4 at the 2019 Canadian Mixed Curling Championship, missing the playoffs.

Mixed doubles
Forward competed at the 2021 New Brunswick Mixed Doubles Championship with partner Chris Jeffrey. They lost out in the qualification round.

Personal life
Forward is employed as a registered nurse with the Horizon Health Network and NurseSimple. She is engaged to Josh Vendenborre. She studied at the University of New Brunswick.

Teams

References

External links

1994 births
Canadian women curlers
Curlers from New Brunswick
Living people
Sportspeople from Fredericton
Sportspeople from Moncton
University of New Brunswick alumni
Canadian nurses
Canadian women nurses